The gallinipper is a cryptid in the African-American folk tradition. These creatures were said to be a species of giant mosquitoes so big that their bones could fence a 140-acre field. A popular telling of the legends has the creature get its bill out of a tree trunk, with the animal being large enough to clear 140 acres of land during the struggle. Gallinipper tales were appropriated as a feature of minstrel shows, but have also appeared in American blues songs such as "Mosquito Moan" by Blind Lemon Jefferson [Paramount 12899], 1929.

References

American legendary creatures
Mythological insects